Statistics of Soviet Top League for the 1973 season.

Overview
It was contested by 16 teams, and Ararat Yerevan won the championship.

League standings

Results
Results in brackets indicate the results from penalty shoot-outs whenever games were drawn.

Top scorers
18 goals
 Oleg Blokhin (Dynamo Kyiv)

16 goals
 Anatoli Kozhemyakin (Dynamo Moscow)

13 goals
 Arkady Andreasyan (Ararat)

12 goals
 Berador Abduraimov (Pakhtakor)
 Aleksandr Piskaryov (Spartak Moscow)

11 goals
 Mikhail Bulgakov (Spartak Moscow)
 Givi Nodia (Dinamo Tbilisi)

10 goals
 Eduard Markarov (Ararat)
 Vitali Starukhin (Shakhtar)

9 goals
 Vladimir Dorofeyev (CSKA)
 Viktor Kuznetsov (Zorya)

References
Soviet Union - List of final tables (RSSSF)

1969
1
Soviet
Soviet